Almost Never is a British musical dramedy series that premiered on CBBC on 15 January 2019. The series details the experiences of two fictional bands after their appearances on a reality television competition and features performances from cast members in each episode. Almost Never stars Nathaniel Dass, Harry Still, Oakley Orchard, Mya-Lecia Naylor, Miriam Nyarko, Lola Moxom, Lilly Stanion, Kimberly Wyatt, Tillie Amartey, Tyra Rayne and Aston Merrygold. In 2020, it was announced that Almost Never had been renewed for a third series, which premiered in July 2021.

Premise
Almost Never follows the lives of two bands, the Wonderland and Girls Here First, following their appearance on the fictional music competition series The Spotlight.

Cast and characters

Main
 Nathaniel Dass as Nate, the lead singer and songwriter of the Wonderland.
 Harry Still as Harry, a guitarist in the Wonderland and the older brother of Oakley. 
 Oakley Orchard as Oakley, a guitarist in the Wonderland and the younger brother of Harry.
 Mya-Lecia Naylor as Mya, a member of Girls Here First who begins a relationship with Oakley. (series 1)
 Miriam Nyarko as Miriam, a member of Girls Here First. 
 Lola Moxom as Lola, a member of Girls Here First.
 Lilly Stanion as Lilly, a member of Girls Here First.
 Kimberly Wyatt as Sasha, the controlling manager of Girls Here First.
 Tillie Amartey as Chloe, a vlogger and the social media manager of the Wonderland.
 Tyra Rayne as Tyra, a waitress at the Palais restaurant who is asked to be a member of Girls Here First. (series 2–present)
 Aston Merrygold as Jordan, the manager of the Wonderland. (series 2–present)

Recurring
 Colin Hoult as AJ, the father of Harry and Oakley who manages the Wonderland until they are signed to Coleen's company.
 Emily Atack as Meg, the mother of Harry and Oakley.
 Simran Rakar as Molly, the younger sister of Nate. 
 Imogen Chadwick as Elena, the best friend of Molly and eventual social media manager of the Wonderland.
 Zina Badran as Anika, the mother of Nate and Molly. (series 1–2)
 Ryan Early as Dan, the owner of the Palais restaurant.
 Michelle Gayle as Coleen, the boss of Sasha. She signs the Wonderland to her management company. (series 1–2)
 Luke Fetherston as Fabio, Sasha's assistant and the eventual manager of Girls Here First.
 Stephen Rahman-Hughes as Dev, the father of Nate and Molly. (series 2)
 Victoria Ekanoye as Ashley, the boss of Coleen. (series 2)
 Alexis Strum as Helen, the mother of Lola. (series 3)
 Amber Davies as Jess, Dan's younger sister and Lola's coach. (series 3)

Production
The first series of Almost Never filmed in Belfast from 12 August to 15 November 2018. The series was announced on 18 December 2018.  Three months after the debut of the first series, it was announced that cast member Mya-Lecia Naylor had died by misadventure. For the second series, the part of Mya was not recast; instead, her absence was explained by her having left Girls Here First following the group's disastrous European tour.
 
The cast was increased in the second series, with the additions of Aston Merrygold and Tyra Richardson, as well as Stephen Rahman-Hughes and Victoria Ekanoye in recurring capacities. On 2 January 2020, it was announced that CBBC has renewed Almost Never for a third series. On 29 May 2020, the Almost Never Instagram account uploaded an open casting call for children aged between 13 and 17 to audition for the third series. 

Cast regularly get involved in production vlogs and backstage content. Girls Here First star Miriam Nyarko has a series of "Week in the Life" Vlogs on her channel, which show the life of an Almost Never cast-member. Her co-star Tillie Amartey also has her own vlogging series on the official Almost Never Channel (Tillie Vlogs).

International broadcast
In August 2021, it was announced that Almost Never had been acquired by Disney Channel; the series began airing in the United States on 4 September 2021.

Episodes

Music

References

External links
 
 

2010s British LGBT-related drama television series
2010s British children's television series
2010s British music television series
2019 British television series debuts
2020s British LGBT-related drama television series
2020s British children's television series
2020s British music television series
2021 British television series endings
BBC children's television shows
British children's musical television series
CBBC shows
English-language television shows
Television shows filmed in Northern Ireland